Petra Kandarr (née Vogt; 20 August 1950 in Halle – 12 March 2017 in Karlsruhe) was an East German sprinter who specialized in the 100- and 200-metre track events.

Biography
At the 1969 European Championships she won gold medals in both the 100 m and 200 m as well as a gold medal in 4x100 metres relay together with teammates Bärbel Podeswa, Renate Meißner and Regina Höfer. For this achievement she was selected as the DDR Sportswoman of the Year.

At the 1971 European Championships she won a silver medal in relay together with teammates Karin Balzer, Renate Stecher and Ellen Stropahl. Kandarr then won a silver medal in 60 metres at the 1973 European Indoor Championships, behind Annegret Richter of West Germany.

She competed for the club SC Chemie Halle during her active career.

Her daughter Jana Kandarr, born 1976, is a former professional tennis player and competed at the 2000 Olympic Games.

References

1950 births
2017 deaths
East German female sprinters
Sportspeople from Halle (Saale)
SC Chemie Halle athletes
European Athletics Championships medalists